Premier Tower is a mixed-use skyscraper on the corner of Bourke and Spencer Streets, in Melbourne, Australia.

Designed by Elenberg Fraser, plans for a 294-metre (965 ft) tall building with 90-storeys were initially proposed in 2014; however, in order not to cast a shadow on the Yarra River to the south, both the height and the number of levels of the project were reduced in later plans, which were submitted to the Department of Planning. In May 2015, Planning Minister Richard Wynne approved the development, which now consists of a 246–metre high residential and hotel skyscraper of 78 levels. When built, Premier Tower will become one of the tallest buildings in Melbourne. According to Elenberg Fraser, the design of the building pays homage to a Beyoncé music video that captures the curves of the human form.

Early construction on the project commenced in January 2017. The skyscraper is developed by the Fragrance Group Limited at a development cost of AUD$430 million.

References

External links

 

Skyscrapers in Melbourne
Residential skyscrapers in Australia
Apartment buildings in Melbourne
Skyscraper hotels in Australia
Buildings and structures completed in 2021
Buildings and structures in Melbourne City Centre
2021 establishments in Australia